Hata (written: , ,  or ) is a Japanese surname. Notable people with the surname include:

, Japanese musician and lyricist
, Japanese historian
, Japanese mixed martial artist
, Japanese footballer
, Japanese manga artist
, Japanese zoologist, essayist, and filmmaker
, Japanese footballer
, Japanese sprint canoeist
, Japanese singer-songwriter
Prateep Ungsongtham Hata (born 1952), Thai activist and politician
Rocky Hata (1948–1991), Japanese professional wrestler
, Japanese bacteriologist
, Japanese singer and idol
, Japanese field marshal during World War II
, Japanese painter
, Japanese politician and cabinet minister in the Empire of Japan
, Japanese politician and Prime Minister of Japan
, Japanese politician
, Japanese stand-up comedian
, Japanese politician

See also
Hata clan

Japanese-language surnames